Narendra Shankar Tamhane  (4 August 1931 – 19 March 2002) was an Indian cricketer who played in 21 Test matches from 1955 to 1960. He was a wicket-keeper-batsman.

His first-class career extended from 1951–52 to 1968–69. He played in the Ranji Trophy for Bombay from 1953–54 to 1963–64.

Later he served on the selection committees for Mumbai and India which selected Sachin Tendulkar for first-class and international cricket.

Tamhane studied at the Siddharth College of Arts, Science and Commerce in Fort, Mumbai.

References

External links

1931 births
2002 deaths
India Test cricketers
Indian cricketers
Mumbai cricketers
Indian Universities cricketers
India national cricket team selectors
Cricketers from Mumbai
Wicket-keepers